Zong Lei (born July 26, 1981) is a former Chinese football player.

Club career
Zong Lei started his football career playing for the Tianjin Teda F.C. youth team before breaking into the senior team during the 2001 league season. While at Tianjin Teda he would struggle to gain any significant playing time and after several seasons he would transfer to Shandong Luneng where he replaced Deng Xiaofei for the goalkeeping position for a short period. It was during this time that he would win the Chinese FA Cup and Super League Cup at the end of the 2004 league season, however the following season saw him lose his place within the team. By the beginning of the 2006 league season newly promoted Changchun Yatai were interested in him and he was allowed to leave after a 2 million yuan transfer. At Changchun Yatai he would immediately become their first choice goalkeeper and see them surprise many by coming fourth in the league. The following season saw him improve upon the previous season's results and he would go on to play a key role in their 2007 Chinese Super League title winning season. Zong returned to Tianjin Teda in 2013. He retired from football at the end of 2016 season.

International career
In preparation for the 2007 AFC Asian Cup Zong Lei would play in a friendly against Kazakhstan on February 2, 2007 where he made his international debut in a game, which China won 2-1. His performance was considered good enough for the Chinese Head coach Zhu Guanghu to include him in the tournament where he was the third choice goalkeeper and did not play in any games. When the new head coach Vladimir Petrović came in immediately after the tournament Zong Lei would be promoted as the national team's first choice goalkeeper and would play in several FIFA World Cup qualifiers. When China failed to qualify and Vladimir Petrović's reign ended Zong Lei would find himself out of favour and was dropped from the subsequent squads.

Honours
Shandong Luneng
Chinese FA Cup: 2004
Chinese Super League Cup: 2004

Changchun Yatai
Chinese Super League: 2007

References

External links

Player stats at football-lineups

1981 births
Living people
Association football goalkeepers
Chinese footballers
Footballers from Tianjin
China international footballers
2007 AFC Asian Cup players
Tianjin Jinmen Tiger F.C. players
Shandong Taishan F.C. players
Changchun Yatai F.C. players
Chinese Super League players